"Three Stories" is the twenty-first episode of the first season of House, which premiered on Fox on May 17, 2005. David Shore won an Emmy in 2005 for Outstanding Writing for A Drama Series for this episode. It won the Humanitas Prize in the '60 minute' category for the year 2006.

Plot

House begrudgingly agrees to fill in for a sick professor and give a lecture on diagnostics to a class of medical students. On his way to the lecture, he encounters Stacy Warner, his ex-girlfriend whom he has not seen in five years. Stacy asks him to examine her husband Mark, but he looks at his file and tells her that Mark doesn't appear to be sick.

At the lecture, House presents three cases of patients with leg pain to the students. The three stories are intercut with each other; the following summary presents each case in chronological order.

The first patient is a farmer who appears to have been bitten by a snake. Foreman and Chase visit the man's farm and find a timber rattlesnake. However, the farmer suffers an allergic reaction to the anti-venom and a test of the snake’s venom sac indicates that it did not recently bite anyone. The patient continues to decline, and when House informs him he is dying, he asks what will happen to his dog. House then realizes that the farmer was bitten by his dog, and bacteria from its mouth caused necrotizing fasciitis. The dog is euthanized and the farmer’s leg is amputated, but he survives.

The second patient is a teenage girl who collapsed at volleyball practice. Cameron takes an excessively detailed medical history and puts her through several invasive and painful tests, only to discover a thyroid condition causing a depressed mental state and tendinitis. The patient does not improve after thyroxine treatment and suddenly develops hypersensitivity to touch. An MRI reveals a tumor in her leg, and Cameron warns the patient that the surgeon may have to amputate her leg to remove the tumor. In the end, the tumor is removed without amputation and she fully recovers.

House initially presents the third case as Carmen Electra complaining of leg pain after a round of miniature golf. The patient is in reality a middle-aged man with extreme leg pain; the doctors initially write him off as a drug-seeker. House catheterizes the patient and discovers his urine is tea-colored, indicating both blood and waste in the urine. The medical students do not know the differential diagnosis for waste in urine. House's team is by this point observing the lecture, and Cameron suggests muscle death— myoglobin released by dying muscle shuts down the kidneys. House reveals it took three days for doctors to diagnose the patient properly: he had a clotted aneurysm in his leg, leading to infarction.

House’s team realize that the third patient is House himself, five years earlier. Cuddy informs House that the only options are to either amputate his leg or perform a risky bypass surgery (which could either lead to a full recovery or kill him). He opts for the bypass against the advice of both Cuddy and Stacy. The surgery itself goes well, but House is left in extreme pain and goes into cardiac arrest, clinically dying for almost a full minute. Stacy begs House to agree to the amputation, but he refuses again and asks to be put in a medically-induced coma. While he is unconscious, Stacy (as House's medical proxy) knowingly acts against his wishes and authorizes a middle course of treatment: surgery to remove the dead muscle in his leg. As a result, House now has a permanent limp and continues to experience chronic pain.

During the lecture, House deduces that his absent colleague is often sick because he regularly drinks from a mug decorated by his children with lead paint. When Cuddy arrives and informs him the session has over-run by twenty minutes, he presents the mug to her and then leaves. Later that night, House calls Stacy and agrees to treat her husband.

Production
The episode was written by series creator David Shore and directed by Paris Barclay. As the episode differed from Shore's earlier work, Shore was unsure how the episode would be received, as he stated in an interview with Canadian Jewish News, "it was either the worst thing I had ever written or the best. Honestly I wasn't sure." Shore's narrative device of "false flashbacks" was largely influenced by the 1968 French science fiction film Je t'aime, je t'aime as well as Alfred Hitchcock's 1949 film Stage Fright. Fans have compared the episode's storytelling to the thriller The Usual Suspects (1995), which was directed by House executive producer Bryan Singer.

Reception
"Three Stories" was first broadcast in the United States on Fox on May 17, 2005. The episode was watched by 17.68 million viewers, making House the 14th most-watched program of the week. Shore received a Primetime Emmy Award nomination for Outstanding Writing for a Drama Series. Shore was "shocked" when he heard he was nominated. He had been nominated for an Emmy Award twice before, as a producer on Law & Order, but felt this nomination was more personal and individual. Shore won the Emmy Award, and also received the 2006 Humanitas Prize in the 60 Minute Category. "Three Stories" is also responsible for the show's Peabody Award win in 2005. Barclay was nominated for a Directors Guild of America Award, but lost to Michael Apted, who had directed the Rome episode "The Stolen Eagle".

Critics reacted positively to the episode. Matt Zoller Seitz placed the episode second on his list of 2005's best individual television episodes, calling it a "high-point" for the show. Maureen Ryan of the Chicago Tribune praised the episode for its "twisty, smart and moving storytelling".

References

External links 

 "Three Stories" at Fox.com
 

House (season 1) episodes
2005 American television episodes
Emmy Award-winning episodes
Fiction with unreliable narrators
Television episodes directed by Paris Barclay